Steve Redhead (January 1952 in Shropshire – 8 March 2018) was the Professor of Jurisprudence and Head of Law in the Faculty of Arts at Charles Sturt University. He was also an adjunct professor at York University (Toronto) and was visiting Professor of Accelerated Culture at the University of Bolton.

Career 
Redhead held professorships in Canada and the United Kingdom, and a Visiting Professorship at Murdoch University in Australia.  While his later scholarship focused on Paul Virilio and theories of accelerated modernity, he was known for his research on post-youth culture, law, critical criminology, and popular culture and football fanzines.

He held an LLB and LLM from Manchester University, and a PhD from the University of Warwick.  Combining law and cultural studies, his scholarship focused on theories of deviance in both football fandom and dance cultures, along with current interests in speed, terrorism, football memoirs, war and theories of social change.

Redhead was known for a series of scholarly innovations, in theories of deviance, (post) youth culture and accelerated modernity.

While currently working in Bathurst in regional New South Wales, Australia, most of his career was spent at Manchester Metropolitan University where he was Co-Director of the Manchester Institute for Popular Culture with Derek Wynne.  He also was the head of the Creative Industries Taskforce for the Geoff Gallop Government in Western Australia.  He was married to Tara Brabazon, Professor of Education and Head of the School of Teacher Education at Charles Sturt University.

A well-known media commentator, he appeared on the BBC4 programme, Dance Britannia. He was also an active podcaster and developed a series of microinterviews with Tara Brabazon.

His best-known books include Rave Off, End of the Century Party, Repetitive Beat Generation and Sing When You're Winning. His book on Jean Baudrillard, The Jean Baudrillard Reader, was published simultaneously by both Edinburgh University Press and Columbia University Press in 2008. Edinburgh University Press published The Paul Virilio Reader and Paul Virilio: Theorist for an Accelerated Culture in 2004. We have never been postmodern, was published by Edinburgh University Press in 2011, and Football and Accelerated Culture: This Modern Sporting Life was published by Routledge in 2015.

Steve Redhead died on 8 March 2018.

References

External links
 Steve Redhead: MANC — Mobile Accelerated Nonpostmodern Culture (archived 2014)

 Steve Redhead at Rock's Back Pages
 https://www.ucalgary.ca/hic/files/hic/McRae%20and%20the%20Redhead%20Review.pdf - "The Redhead Review" by Leanne McRae
 https://archive.org/search.php?query=Steve%20Redhead - Open Access audio interviews with Steve Redhead

1952 births
2018 deaths
Academics of the University of Brighton
Academic staff of Charles Sturt University